Dot Cliff is the cliff at the west end of the spur between the Dimick Peaks and Berry Spur in the Royal Society Range. It was descriptively named by the Advisory Committee on Antarctic Names in 1994, suggested by the appearance of the small rock cliff at the end of a snow-covered mountain spur.

References 

Cliffs of Victoria Land
Scott Coast